The 1972 Cork Senior Hurling Championship was the 84th staging of the Cork Senior Hurling Championship since its establishment by the Cork County Board in 1887. The championship began on 7 April 1972 and ended on 12 November 1972.

Blackrock entered the championship as the defending champions, however, they were beaten by St. Finbarr's in the first round.

The final was played on 12 November 1972 at the Athletic Grounds in Cork, between Glen Rovers and Youghal, in what was their first ever meeting in the final. Glen Rovers won the match by 3-15 to 1-10 to claim their 23rd championship title overall and a first title in three years.

Patsy Harte from the Glen Rovers club was the championship's top scorer with 3-14.

Team changes

To Championship

Promoted from the Cork Intermediate Hurling Championship
 Nemo Rangers

From Championship

Regraded to the Cork Intermediate Hurling Championship
 Cloyne

Results

First round

Second round

Quarter-finals

Semi-finals

Final

Championship statistics

Top scorers

Top scorers overall

Top scorers in a single game

Miscellaneous

 Youghal qualified for the final for the first time in their history.

References

Cork Senior Hurling Championship
Cork Senior Hurling Championship